Hungry Hearts is a 1916 American silent comedy short film, filmed in Jacksonville, Florida by Vim Comedy Company, and featuring a young Oliver Hardy.

Cast
 Oliver Hardy as Plump (billed as "Babe Hardy")
 Billy Ruge as Runt
 Ray Godfrey as A Model
 Edna Reynolds as A Widow
 Bert Tracy as Art Connoisseur

See also
 List of American films of 1916
 Oliver Hardy filmography

External links

1916 films
1916 short films
American silent short films
American black-and-white films
1916 comedy films
Silent American comedy films
American comedy short films
1910s American films